Épinay-sur-Seine (literally Épinay on Seine) is a commune in the Val-d'Oise department, in the northern suburbs of Paris, France. The church of Notre-Dame-des-Missions-du-cygne d'Enghien, designed by Paul Tournon, may be found in the commune.

History
On 7 August 1850, a part of the territory of Épinay-sur-Seine was detached and merged with a part of the territory of Deuil-la-Barre, a part of the territory of Saint-Gratien, and a part of the territory of Soisy-sous-Montmorency to create the commune of Enghien-les-Bains.

Francis, Duke of Cádiz (13 May 1822 – 17 April 1902), king consort of Spain, took up residence at the château of Épinay-sur-Seine in 1881 until his death in 1902. The chateau now serves as Épinay-sur-Seine's city hall.

From 1902 it was home to the Epinay Studios.

Population

Town twinning

Épinay-sur-Seine is twinned with:
Oberursel, Germany since 1964
South Tyneside (before 1974: Jarrow), England since 1965
Alcobendas, Spain since 1986

Transport

Épinay-sur-Seine is served by Épinay-sur-Seine station on Paris RER line C. It is also served by Épinay–Villetaneuse station on the Transilien Paris-Nord suburban rail line.

Personalities
Olivier Beaudry, karateka
Maïtena Biraben, journalist
Jean-Claude Bouillon, actor
Harold Correa, athlete
Thomas Gamiette, footballer
Élisabeth Lévy, journalist
Pascal Nouma, footballer
Hornet La Frappe, Rapper
Elizabeth Columba, Artist

Heraldry

See also

Communes of the Seine-Saint-Denis department

References

External links

 

Communes of Seine-Saint-Denis